Devarr Boyles (born 18 July 1970) is a retired Bermudian professional football player and now manager. He has coached Dandy Town Hornets in Bermuda since 2018.

Club career

During the 1990s, he played college soccer for Old Dominion in the United States.

He played for the Dandy Town Hornets.

International career
He made his debut for Bermuda in a May 1999 Caribbean Cup match against Bahamas and earned a total of 6 caps, scoring 2 goals. He has represented his country in 3 FIFA World Cup qualification matches.

His final international match was an April 2000 World Cup qualification match against Antigua and Barbuda.

International goals
Scores and results list Bermuda's goal tally first.

Managerial career
Since March until June 2010 he was a head coach of the Devonshire Cougars.

Since August 2011 until June 2012 he coached the Bermuda national football team.

References

External links

Profile at Soccerpunter.com

1970 births
Living people
Place of birth missing (living people)
Association football midfielders
Bermudian footballers
Bermuda international footballers
Dandy Town Hornets F.C. players
Bermudian football managers
Bermuda national football team managers